Paul Gant Gilliford (born January 12, 1945) is a retired American professional baseball player, a left-handed pitcher who appeared in two Major League games for the  Baltimore Orioles during the course of a five-year (1965–1969) career.

In Gilliford's second pro season, 1966, he led the Class A Florida State League in earned run average (1.27) and posted a 16–3 won–lost record. On June 14 of that season, he pitched 11 scoreless innings during a 29-inning game between the Miami Marlins and the St. Petersburg Cardinals, the longest uninterrupted game, by innings, in professional baseball history. After splitting the 1967 minor league season between the Class A California League and the Double-A Eastern League, Gilliford was called up by the MLB Orioles for a late-season trial. He pitched two scoreless innings against the Washington Senators in his debut, but in his second appearance, also in relief four days later, the Boston Red Sox reached him for five hits, including a home run by George Scott, and four earned runs. In three Major League innings pitched, Gilliford gave up six hits and one base on balls, with two strikeouts.

He returned to the minor leagues in 1968–1969 before leaving the game.

References

External links

1945 births
Living people
Aberdeen Pheasants players
Baltimore Orioles players
Baseball players from Pennsylvania
Bluefield Orioles players
Elmira Pioneers players
Iowa Oaks players
Major League Baseball pitchers
Miami Marlins (FSL) players
People from Bryn Mawr, Pennsylvania
Stockton Ports players